Calliostoma zizyphinum, common name the European painted top shell, is a species of sea snail, a marine gastropod mollusk in the family Calliostomatidae.

Description
The solid, regularly conical shell is straight-sided and imperforate. The shell contains up to 12–13 whorls. It is sculptured with regular spiral grooves and ridges, traversed by fine prosocline growth lines. The apex is minute, composed of a single smooth rounded
whorl, Several whorls follow, each with 4 granose spiral ridges. These become smooth and either obsolete or narrow on the later whorls. The body whorl has a prominent peripheral keel bearing two broad ridges; ridges above suture in preceding whorls. Base of shell rather flat, inner lips reflected over shallow umbilical groove. The periphery is angular, encircled by a smooth rounded rib that becomes a supra-sutural band or fasciole on the spire. The base of the shell is nearly flat. The aperture is quadrate. The cylindrical columella is nearly straight.

The color of the shell is variable. The ground color is yellowish brown, pale pink, or violet with streaks and blotches of brown, red or purple on the periphery. Blotches on the keel are generally darker, more frequent and more regular than on other parts of shell. It is radiately clouded with brown on the upper surface. The base of the shell is unicolored or obscurely radiately streaked. Pure white or violet specimens are occasionally found.

Parasites
This species is host to the following parasites:
 Trochicola entericus Dollfus, 1914 (ectoparasitic copepod) 
 Endocheres obscurus Bocquet & Stock, 1956 ( ectoparasitic copepod) 
 Trochicola enterica Dollfus, 1914 (endoparasitic copepod)

Predators
The starfish Asterias rubens is a known predator of Calliostoma zizyphinus

Distribution
This marine species occurs in European waters from Northern Norway to the Azores; in the Mediterranean Sea.

References

 Backeljau, T. (1986). Lijst van de recente mariene mollusken van België [List of the recent marine molluscs of Belgium]. Koninklijk Belgisch Instituut voor Natuurwetenschappen: Brussels, Belgium. 106 pp. 
Checklist of species (algae, invertebrates and vertebrates) found in the vicinity of the island of Helgoland (North Sea, German Bight) - a review of recent records. Helgoländer Meeresuntersuch. 47 1: 1–34.
 Gofas, S.; Le Renard, J.; Bouchet, P. (2001). Mollusca, in: Costello, M.J. et al. (Ed.) (2001). European register of marine species: a check-list of the marine species in Europe and a bibliography of guides to their identification. Collection Patrimoines Naturels, 50: pp. 180–213
 Muller, Y. (2004). Faune et flore du littoral du Nord, du Pas-de-Calais et de la Belgique: inventaire. [Coastal fauna and flora of the Nord, Pas-de-Calais and Belgium: inventory]. Commission Régionale de Biologie Région Nord Pas-de-Calais: France. 307 pp.

External links
 Natural History Museum, London (NHM): Collections Management Database System
 

zizyphinum
Gastropods described in 1758
Taxa named by Carl Linnaeus